Rima Akberdinovna Batalova (born 1 January 1964) is a Russian politician. She was formerly a Paralympian athlete competing mainly in category T12 middle-distance events.

Biography
Batalova has competed in six Paralympics, she first competed as part of the Soviet Union team in the 1988 Summer Paralympics where she won golds in the 1500m and 200m and a bronze in the 300m.  In barcelona in 1992 competing as part of the Unified team she won a further four gold medals in the 200m, 400m, 800m and 1500m as well as silver in the 100m and finishing outside the medals in the 300m.  In her next two in 1996 and 2000 she was undefeated, winning 7 gold medals in total including defending her 800m and 1500m titles.  In 2004 and 2008 she only competed in the 800m and 1500m but was unable to achieve the same glory with just a silver and bronze in 2004 and nothing in 2008 bringing her tally to 13 gold, 2 silver and 2 bronze.

She was elected to the State Duma in 2016.

She is one of the members of the State Duma the United States Treasury sanctioned on 24 March 2022 in response to the 2022 Russian invasion of Ukraine.

References

Paralympic athletes of the Soviet Union
Paralympic athletes of the Unified Team
Paralympic athletes of Russia
Athletes (track and field) at the 1988 Summer Paralympics
Athletes (track and field) at the 1992 Summer Paralympics
Athletes (track and field) at the 1996 Summer Paralympics
Athletes (track and field) at the 2000 Summer Paralympics
Athletes (track and field) at the 2004 Summer Paralympics
Athletes (track and field) at the 2008 Summer Paralympics
Paralympic gold medalists for the Soviet Union
Paralympic bronze medalists for the Soviet Union
Paralympic gold medalists for the Unified Team
Paralympic silver medalists for the Unified Team
Paralympic gold medalists for Russia
Paralympic silver medalists for Russia
Paralympic bronze medalists for Russia
Living people
People from Bashkortostan
Medalists at the 1988 Summer Paralympics
Medalists at the 1992 Summer Paralympics
Medalists at the 1996 Summer Paralympics
Medalists at the 2000 Summer Paralympics
Medalists at the 2004 Summer Paralympics
1964 births
Paralympic medalists in athletics (track and field)
Sixth convocation members of the State Duma (Russian Federation)
Seventh convocation members of the State Duma (Russian Federation)
Eighth convocation members of the State Duma (Russian Federation)
Soviet female sprinters
Soviet female middle-distance runners
Russian female sprinters
Russian female middle-distance runners
Russian individuals subject to the U.S. Department of the Treasury sanctions
Russian sportsperson-politicians
Visually impaired middle-distance runners
Visually impaired sprinters
Paralympic sprinters
Paralympic middle-distance runners